Mexico is an unincorporated community in northeastern Tymochtee Township, Wyandot County, Ohio, United States.  Located at  (40.9864448, -83.1932520), it lies at an elevation of 810 feet (247 m).

History
Mexico was laid out and platted in 1832. The community was named in commemoration of the Mexican War of Independence. The community was located in Crawford County until land the town site occupies was given to form Wyandot County in 1845. A post office was established at Mexico in 1837, and remained in operation until 1902.

References

Unincorporated communities in Ohio
Unincorporated communities in Wyandot County, Ohio
1832 establishments in Ohio